The A. Murray MacKay Bridge, known locally as "the new bridge", is a suspension bridge linking the Halifax Peninsula with Dartmouth, Nova Scotia, and opened on July 10, 1970. It is one of two suspension bridges crossing Halifax Harbour. Its counterpart, the Angus L. Macdonald Bridge, was completed in 1955. The bridge carries on average 52,000 vehicle crossings per day, and is part of Nova Scotia Highway 111.

As of January 3, 2022, the toll charge to cross for regular passenger vehicles is $1.25 cash, or $1.00 with the Macpass electronic toll system. Larger vehicles have higher tolls proportional to the number of axles. The Halifax-Dartmouth Bridge Commission is exploring the idea of moving entirely to electronic tolls to avoid handling tokens or cash. The A. Murray MacKay Bridge is the only harbour bridge that permits semi-trailers and large trucks. Pedestrians and bicycles are not permitted on the A. Murray MacKay Bridge; they may instead use dedicated lanes on the Angus L. Macdonald Bridge.

History

Construction
The bridge opened in 1970.

Financing
A decision was made to finance the construction of the bridge with low-interest loans denominated in foreign currencies, saving money in the short term and allowing the tolls to be kept low. In 1969, the bridge commission issued a 10-year bond of 100 million Deutsche Marks in West Germany. In 1973, the bridge commission obtained a loan of C$12.2 million from a Swiss bank.

However, the subsequent decline in the value of the Canadian dollar against the German Mark and the Swiss franc cancelled out the interest cost advantage and caused a massive increase in annual debt servicing costs. At its peak, the commission's debt amounted to nearly $125 million, nearly triple the approximate $42 million combined cost of construction for both harbour bridges.

Design
It was designed with a maximum road gradient of 4 per cent. It is notable as having been the first bridge built in North America using an orthotropic steel deck, which yielded a completed structure having half the overall mass of the nearby Macdonald Bridge. The bridge's engineering also pioneered the use of wind tunnel testing, which considered the impact of winds on the structure both during construction and when complete.

Impact on development
The building of the MacKay Bridge, along with Highway 111, initiated a development boom in Dartmouth which eclipsed that created by the Macdonald Bridge during the 1950s and 1960s.  The Burnside Business Park, the Mic Mac Mall shopping centre, and several residential developments in the Albro Lake neighbourhood in Dartmouth's north end during the 1970s are directly attributable to the bridge's construction.

Controversies

Africville
Political controversy preceded construction of the MacKay Bridge when the city of Halifax expropriated residents from the community of Africville near the Halifax abutment.

Proposed renaming
The bridge is named after Alexander Murray MacKay, chairman of the Halifax-Dartmouth Bridge Commission from 1951 to 1971 and past chief executive officer of MT&T. MacKay was instrumental in having both the Angus L. Macdonald Bridge and his namesake structure built during his tenure at the commission.

Following the death of former Nova Scotia premier Robert L. Stanfield in 2003, there was a motion made to rename the MacKay Bridge to honour Stanfield, but the Stanfield family did not want any current structures already named for persons to be changed for Stanfield's sake.  In 2007, the Halifax International Airport was renamed Halifax - Robert L. Stanfield International Airport; several new schools and other institutional buildings are also under consideration for Stanfield's name.

See also 
 List of bridges in Canada

References

External links

 Halifax-Dartmouth Bridge Commission, information on A. Murray MacKay Bridge
 
 Google Maps Satellite view of the MacKay Bridge
 MarineTraffic

Buildings and structures in Halifax, Nova Scotia
Road bridges in Nova Scotia
Suspension bridges in Canada
Bridges completed in 1970
Toll bridges in Canada
Transport in Halifax, Nova Scotia